Goran Lozanovski (born 11 January 1974) is a former  Australian football (soccer) player of Macedonian descent, and current manager holding the role of senior coach at Sydenham Park SC.

Playing career

Club
Noted for his ability at taking set pieces, Lozanovski signed with South Melbourne in 1997 under Ange Postecoglou, where he would go on to win 2 National Soccer League grand finals in both the 1997–1998, and 1998–1999 seasons. In the 1999 Grand Final against Sydney United, Lozanovski was awarded the prestigious Joe Marston Medal in South Melbourne's 3–2 victory.

Lozanovski's success at South Melbourne paved the way for him to link up with fellow Socceroo Mark Rudan at then-2. Bundesliga club Alemannia Aachen. However, his stay at the club would last only 12 games after being embroiled in the 'suitcase affair' corruption scandal in 2001, after financial irregularities arose following both Australian players transfers to the club. After Rudan was briefly arrested by German authorities over the scandal, charges were laid on the clubs treasurer Bernd Krings, who was convicted of financial fraud. Both Lozanovski and Rudan were eventually cleared, with both players departing the club shortly after.

Returning home, Lozanovski had stints in South Australia with Adelaide City, Adelaide United, and Western Strikers during the dying years of the National Soccer League. He saw out his career in the Victorian State Leagues with Heidelberg United and Preston Lions respectively, where he retired in 2008.

Managerial
Following his retirement, Lozanovski immediately took up a head coaching position at Preston Lions. He would go on to briefly coach both Hume City, and his 2013 Grand Final opponents, Bentleigh Greens before joining Northcote City. During the 2012 season at Northcote, Lozanovski was promoted to head coach, following Peter Tsolakis' departure to South Melbourne.

In 2013, Lozanovski took Northcote FC to their first ever Victorian Premier League Championship, defeating Bentleigh Greens in which would be the last season of the Victorian Premier League system, before it was re-branded into the National Premier Leagues Victoria. Lozanovski decided to resign as Manager at Northcote following the 2015 season and joined Port Melbourne SC as an Assistant Manager ahead of the 2016 season.

Honours

Player
South Melbourne FC
National Soccer League Premiership: 1997-1998
National Soccer League Championship: 1997-1998,1998-1999
Joe Marston Medal: 1999

Manager
Preston Lions
Victorian Premier League Premiership: 2007
Victorian Premier League Championship:2007
Northcote FC
Victorian Premier League Premiership: 2013
Victorian Premier League Championship: 2013

References

External links
 Oz Football profile

1974 births
Living people
Australian people of Macedonian descent
Australian soccer players
Australian expatriate soccer players
Australia international soccer players
National Soccer League (Australia) players
Adelaide City FC players
Adelaide United FC players
South Melbourne FC players
Preston Lions FC players
Preston Lions FC managers
Hume City FC managers
Australian Institute of Sport soccer players
Bentleigh Greens SC managers
Olympic soccer players of Australia
Collingwood Warriors S.C. players
Association football midfielders
Australian soccer coaches
Australian Macedonian soccer managers
Footballers at the 1996 Summer Olympics
1998 OFC Nations Cup players
Australia youth international soccer players
Australian expatriate sportspeople in Germany
Expatriate footballers in Germany
Soccer players from Melbourne